Erik Gerbi (born 11 June 2000) is an Italian footballer who plays as a forward for  club Pro Sesto on loan from Sampdoria.

Club career
He made his Serie B debut for Pro Vercelli on 18 May 2018 in a game against Cittadella as an 82nd-minute substitute for Claudio Morra.

On 31 January 2019, he was purchased by Juventus for €1.45 million and loaned back to Pro Vercelli until the end of the 2018–19 season. In the same window Juventus also sold Simone Emmanuello to Pro Vercelli for €0.95 million as part of the deal.

On 30 January 2020, Sampdoria acquired his rights on loan with an obligation to buy.

On 5 October 2020 he joined Teramo on loan. On 1 August 2022, Gerbi was loaned to Pro Sesto.

References

External links
 

2000 births
People from Ivrea
Footballers from Piedmont
Living people
Italian footballers
Association football forwards
F.C. Pro Vercelli 1892 players
Juventus Next Gen players
S.S. Teramo Calcio players
U.C. Sampdoria players
Serie A players
Serie B players
Serie C players
Liga II players
SSU Politehnica Timișoara players
S.S.D. Pro Sesto players
Italian expatriate footballers
Italian expatriate sportspeople in Romania
Expatriate footballers in Romania
Sportspeople from the Metropolitan City of Turin
21st-century Italian people